Air Mauritanie was the national airline of Mauritania from 1962 until it ceased operations in 2007 due to financial difficulties. It was based at Nouakchott International Airport, from where it operated domestic services, as well as flights to African destinations and Paris. The carrier had its headquarters in Nouakchott.

History

Operations started in  the same year, with Spantax leasing DC-3 equipment, and also providing technical assistance. A Nord 262 was ordered in 1965. The airline was reorganised in 1967, and shareholding was divided between the government of Mauritania (60%), Air Afrique (20%) and Union de Transports Aériens (UTA) (20%). Two Ilyushin Il-18s were bought in 1969, with the Soviets providing training and technical assistance; these aircraft were flown to Dakar, Nouadhibou and Las Palmas.

At , the airline had 120 employees and operated a domestic network plus international services to the Canary Islands and Mali using one DC-3, one DC-4, and an Il-18. In , a five-year contract was signed with Hughes Airwest for the provision of capacity building of the pilots and mechanics. The number of employees had grown to 170 by  the same year, with a fleet comprising one DC-3, two DC-4s and one Navajo. At this time, Casablanca, Dakar and Las Palmas were part of the airline's list of international destinations, as well as domestic services radiating from Nouakchott and Nouadhibou. That year, the carrier acquired two 40-seater F-227As valued at  million. In , the company was reorganised again and renamed Société d'Economie Mixte Air Mauritanie. By , the government of Mauritania was the major shareholder of the company (60%), with the balance evenly split between Air Afrique and UTA.

These two aircraft made up the fleet in late ; at this time, there were 259 employees. On 1 July 1994, a Fokker F28 was lost in an accident while landing at Tidjikja Airport during a sandstorm. Two ATR 42s were ordered in 1996 for replacement of the Fokker F28 aircraft.

At , the staff stood at 259. The fleet comprised a single Fokker F28-4000 that served Abidjan, Aioun el Atrouss, Atar, Bamako, Banjul, Casablanca, Dakar, Kiffa, Las Palmas, Nema, Nouadhibou, Nouakchott, Tidjikja and Zouerate. At this time, Air Afrique had a 20% participation in the airline. In mid-2000, the Pan-African carrier boosted its shareholding in the company to 32%.

Among other carriers, Air Mauritanie was blacklisted because of the failure of the Mauritanian civil aviation authority to comply with ICAO standards. The economical situation of the carrier entered a steep decline in mid-2005, when the crisis forced the government to replace the airline's Director. It was reported in  that Royal Air Maroc would take a majority stake (51%) in the airline and to effectively take over its management; at this time, the major stockholders were the Nationale d'assurances et réassurance (40%), the Banque Mauritanienne de Commerce International, Établissements Noueigued, and Star Oil Mauritanie.

By 2007, Air Mauritanie was so indebted that in  two aircraft were seized for debts with the leasing company, the International Lease Finance Corporation, followed by the impoundment of the presidential aircraft, a Boeing 727-200. Debts for leasing these three aircraft had risen to  million. Two months later, Mauritania Airways started operations.

Destinations
Air Mauritanie was based at Nouakchott International Airport. The airline served the following destinations all through its history:

Historical fleet
Air Mauritanie operated the following aircraft along the years:

ATR 42
Boeing 727-200 (VIP-configured, flown for the Mauritanian government)
Boeing 737-700
DC-3
DC-4
Fairchild F-27
Fokker F28-4000
Fokker F28-6000
Il-18

Accidents and incidents
, Air Mauritanie experienced five accidents or incidents, according to Aviation Safety Network. The only event that lead to fatalities occurred on 1994-7-1 during a landing accident. Following is the list of these events.

See also

 Transport in Mauritania
 List of defunct airlines of Mauritania

References

Bibliography

External links
 Air Mauritanie (Archive) 

Defunct airlines of Mauritania
Airlines established in 1962
Airlines disestablished in 2007
1962 establishments in Africa
2007 disestablishments in Africa